The 3rd CC.NN. Division "21 Aprile" was an Italian CC.NN. (Blackshirts militia) division raised on 10 June 1935 for the Second Italo-Ethiopian War against Ethiopia and disbanded shortly before Italy's entry into World War II. The name "21 Aprile" was chosen to commemorate the legendary date of the founding of Rome.

History 
The division was one of six CC.NN. divisions raised in summer 1935 in preparation for the Second Italo-Ethiopian War. Its members were volunteers from the various armed militias of the National Fascist Party's paramilitary wing and came from five regions: the 230th CC.NN. Legion from Abruzzo, the 252nd CC.NN. Legion from Apulia and Basilicata, the 263rd CC.NN. Legion from Calabria and the III CC.NN. Machine Gun Battalion from the Marche.

Second Italo-Ethiopian War 
The division arrived in Massawa in Italian Eritrea on 18-23 September 1935 and immediately began to train for the upcoming war. The division also build roads to facilitate the movement of the II Army Corps, which was earmarked to strike Adwa.
 
The division entered combat on 3 December 1935 at Gulà Gulè and then advanced towards Darò Miscellan-Amba Berach, reaching Addì Ghebetà on 12 and Axum on 15 December. The division covered the advance of the 19th Infantry Division "Gavinana" and on 20 December returned to Axum, where it build a defensive position. On 29 February 1936 the division took part in the Battle of Shire, covering the left flank of II Army Corps. On 2 March the division's 230th CC.NN. Legion "L'Aquila" defeated Ethiopian forces near Amba Adi Malech. The next day the continues its advance to Af Gaga and Cobò Nebrit. At the war's conclusion the division moved to the Tacazzè area, where it resumed the building of roads. The division was then repatriated and disbanded.

World War II 
The division was reformed in 1939 and sent with three other CC.NN. divisions to Italian Libya. This time the members of the division came from four regions: the 181st CC.NN. Legion from the Emilia-Romagna and Umbria, and the 203rd CC.NN. Legion from Umbria, the Marche and Campania. The division was disbanded in May 1940 and its troops used to bring the other three CC.NN. divisions to full strength. The Royal Italian Army units were used to bring the forming 64th Infantry Division "Catanzaro" to full strength.

Organization

1935 
Below follows the division's organization during the Second Italo-Ethiopian War and the cities, in which its CC.NN. battalions were raised; the legion's machine gun companies and artillery batteries were raised in the same cities as the legions.

 3rd CC.NN. Division "21 Aprile"
 230th CC.NN. Legion "L'Aquila", in L'Aquila
 Command Company
 CCXXX CC.NN. Battalion, in L'Aquila
 CCXXXVI CC.NN. Battalion, in Chieti
 230th CC.NN. Machine Gun Company 
 230th CC.NN. Artillery Battery (65/17 infantry support guns)
 252nd CC.NN. Legion "Acciaiata", in Lecce
 Command Company
 CCLII CC.NN. Battalion, in Lecce
 CCLVI CC.NN. Battalion, in Potenza
 252nd CC.NN. Machine Gun Company
 252nd CC.NN. Artillery Battery (65/17 infantry support guns) 
 263rd CC.NN. Legion "Tommaso Gulli", in Reggio Calabria
 Command Company
 CCLXIII CC.NN. Battalion, in Reggio Calabria
 CCLXIV CC.NN. Battalion, in Catanzaro
 263rd CC.NN. Machine Gun Company
 263rd CC.NN. Artillery Battery (65/17 infantry support guns)
 III CC.NN. Machine Gun Battalion, in Ascoli Piceno
 III Artillery Group (65/17 infantry support guns, Royal Italian Army)
 III Mixed Transport Unit (Royal Italian Army)
 III Supply Unit (Royal Italian Army)
 2x CC.NN. replacement battalions
 3rd Special Engineer Company (Mixed CC.NN. and Royal Italian Army)
 3rd Medical Section (Royal Italian Army)
 3rd Logistic Section (Royal Italian Army)
 3rd Carabinieri Section

The supply unit had 1,600 mules and the mixed transport unit 80 light trucks. The division engaged in war crimes in Ethiopia during the Second Italo-Ethiopian War.

1940 
Below follows the division's organization during its time in Italian Libya and the cities, in which its CC.NN. battalions were raised.

  3rd CC.NN. Division "21 Aprile"
 181st CC.NN. Legion, in Ravenna
 Command Company
 LXXI CC.NN. Battalion, in Faenza
 LXXXI CC.NN. Battalion, in Ravenna
 CII CC.NN. Battalion, in Perugia
 18st CC.NN. Machine Gun Company
 203rd CC.NN. Legion, in Foligno
 Command Company
 CIII CC.NN. Battalion, in Foligno
 CX CC.NN. Battalion, in Ascoli Piceno
 CXLIII CC.NN. Battalion, in Benevento
 203rd CC.NN. Machine Gun Company
 203rd Motorized Artillery Regiment (Royal Italian Army)
 Command Unit
 I Group (100/17 howitzers)
 II Group (75/27 field guns)
 III Group (75/27 field guns)
 2x Anti-aircraft batteries (20/65 Mod. 35 anti-aircraft guns)
 Ammunition and Supply Unit
 CCIII Machine Gun Battalion (Royal Italian Army)
 CCIII Mixed Engineer Battalion (Royal Italian Army)
 Command Platoon
 1x Engineer Company
 1x Telegraph and Radio Operators Company
 1x Searchlight Section
 203rd CC.NN. Anti-tank Company (47/32 anti-tank guns)
 203rd CC.NN. Support Weapons Battery (65/17 infantry support guns)
 203rd CC.NN. Mortar Company (81mm Mod. 35 mortars)
 203rd Transport Section (Royal Italian Army)
 203rd Supply Section (Royal Italian Army)
 203rd Medical Section (Royal Italian Army)
 3x Field hospitals
 1x Surgical Unit
 705th Carabinieri Section
 706th Carabinieri Section
 303rd Field Post Office

Commanding officers 
During the Second Italo-Ethiopian War:

 Generale di Divisione Giacomo Appiotti (10 June 1936 - November 1936)

References

Sources 
 Ettore Lucas and Giorgio de Vecchi, "Storia delle Unità Combattenti della MVSN 1923-1943", Giovanni Volpe Editore, 1976. pages 63 to 116 plus errata
 George F. Nafziger - Italian Order of Battle: An organizational history of the Italian Army in World War II (3 vol)

Blackshirt divisions of Italy
Divisions of Italy in World War II
Divisions of Italy of the Second Italo-Ethiopian War